TGT may stand for:

Chemistry 
 Tagetitoxin
 TRNA-guanine15 transglycosylase, an enzyme
 Cysteine, an amino acid coded TGT

Arts and media 
 TGT (group), R&B supergroup formed by Tyrese, Ginuwine, and Tank
 Thailand's Got Talent, Thai reality television series
 The Grand Tour, British motoring programme

Businesses 
 TGT Oil and Gas Services
 Target Corporation, NYSE stock ticker
 Tennessee Gas Transmission Company

Other uses 
 Tamangic languages (Tamang, Gurung, Thakali and others)
 Tanga Airport, by IATA code, in Tanga, Tanzania
 Target (disambiguation)
 Ticket Granting Ticket, in network security
 Transitional Government of Tigray, in Ethiopia
 Trained Graduate Teacher, a teacher who holds a degree for teaching students